Nalla Idathu Sammandham is 1958 Indian Tamil-language drama film directed by K. Somu. It was the debut production of writer A. P. Nagarajan, who co-produced the film with V. K. Ramasamy. The story was provided by Ramasamy himself, while the screenplay was written by Nagarajan. It stars M. R. Radha, Prem Nazir, Sowcar Janaki and M. N. Rajam. The soundtrack and background score were composed by K. V. Mahadevan.

Plot 

A wealthy man with a wayward son and a daughter, who is a nurse, thinks his son would change his ways if he gets married. He arranges a marriage for his son with another wealthy man's daughter, and sends the communication to his son and daughter. The wedding comes as a surprise to the son who does not intend getting married. However, he informs his sister he will be present at the wedding ceremony. He turns up just in time to tie the mangala sutra. The young bride joins her husband with hopes of a happy marriage, but her life turns out to be sheer torture. Meanwhile, the nurse falls in love with a police officer, and soon the story takes a few turns and twists. Finally, the wayward son reforms, and all live happily.

Cast 

 M. R. Radha as Muthu
 Sowcar Janaki as Rathinam
 Prem Nazir as Manickam
 M. N. Rajam as Maragatham
 V. K. Ramasamy as Muthu's father
 C. K. Saraswathi
 K. Sarangapani
 Madi Lakshmi as Mohana
 V. M. Ezhumalai
 P. D. Sambandam as Rummy
 Kallapart Natarajan as Jacky

Production 
The film marked the production debut of A. P. Nagarajan. He co-founded a production company named "Lakshmi Pictures" with actor V. K. Ramasamy. Ramasamy provided the story, while Nagarajan wrote the screenplay and dialogues for the film. The film was shot in Madras and Salem.

Soundtrack 
The film's music was composed by K. V. Mahadevan and lyrics were written A. Maruthakasi and A. S. Narayanan. The film established L. R. Eswari's career as a playback singer.

Reception 
The film was released on 16 February 1958, and was successful at the box office. The performances of M. R. Radha, Sowcar Janaki and V. K. Ramasamy received critical acclaim. The film marked a turning point in Radha's career.

References

External links 

 

1950s Tamil-language films
1958 drama films
1958 films
Films directed by K. Somu
Films scored by K. V. Mahadevan
Films set in Chennai
Films with screenplays by A. P. Nagarajan
Indian black-and-white films
Indian drama films